Walter Henry Meinert (December 11, 1890 – November 9, 1958) was an American Major League Baseball right fielder who played for the St. Louis Browns in .

External links
Baseball Reference.com

1890 births
1958 deaths
St. Louis Browns players
Baseball players from New York (state)
Superior Brickmakers players
Burlington Pathfinders players
Ottumwa Packers players
La Crosse Infants players
Cedar Rapids Rabbits players
Clear Lake Rabbits players
Danville Veterans players
Terre Haute Tots players